Falkirk Football Club is a Scottish professional association football club based in the town of Falkirk. The club was founded in 1876 and competes in Scottish League One, the third tier of Scottish football, as a member of the Scottish Professional Football League. The club was elected to the Second Division of the Scottish Football League in 1902–03, was promoted to the First Division after two seasons and achieved its highest league position in the early 1900s when it was runner-up to Celtic in 1907–08 and 1909–10. The football club was registered as a Limited Liability Company in April 1905 – Falkirk Football & Athletic Club Ltd.

Falkirk won the Scottish Cup for the first time in 1913. After 1945, Falkirk were promoted and demoted between the Premier and First Divisions seven times until 1995–96, and during the 1970s spent three seasons in the Second Division. In 2005, Falkirk were promoted to the Scottish Premier League (SPL). Falkirk won the Scottish Cup again in 1957 and were runners-up in the competition in 1997, 2009 and 2015. As a result of their performance in the 2009 Scottish Cup, the club qualified for the inaugural season of the UEFA Europa League in 2009–10. Falkirk have won the second tier of Scottish football a record seven times, an honour shared with St Johnstone. They have also won the Scottish Challenge Cup  more than any other club, winning it for the fourth time in 2012.

In their early years, Falkirk played at three venues: Hope Street, Randyford Park and Blinkbonny Park. Between 1885 and 2003, the club was based at Brockville Park, built on the former Hope Street ground. After the creation of the SPL in 1998, its strict stadium criteria – to which Brockville Park did not conform – was enforced, and the club was denied promotion on three occasions. The club's present home ground since 2004 is the Falkirk Stadium, a  all-seater stadium on the outskirts of Falkirk.

History

Club formation and early years 
The club's date of formation is uncertain. Although some accounts point to the year 1876, others claim it was formed in 1877. However, the former is the date used by the club and its fans. In 1878, the club joined the Scottish Football Association, and became eligible to compete in the Scottish Cup, a knockout tournament which became the country's main association football cup competition. The club reached the second round in the first year that it competed. In the first few years after it was formed, Falkirk played mostly friendly games. They played their home matches at three different grounds during this period; Hope Street, Randyford Park and Blinkbonny Park. It left the latter in 1884 and moved to Brockville Park, which remained the club's home ground for 118 years. The Stirlingshire Football Association was founded in 1883, which invited clubs from the Stirlingshire region to join. It resulted in the establishment of a new tournament, the Stirlingshire Cup, a competition open exclusively to the teams from the region, which Falkirk won in its inaugural season. The club's nickname is "The Bairns", a Scots word meaning sons or daughters, which is given to natives of the town of Falkirk.  This is reflected in the Falkirk Burgh motto: "Better meddle wi' the de'il than the Bairns o' Fa'kirk".

Election to the Football League 
After playing mostly regional matches, friendly games and the nationwide Scottish Cup tournament for the majority of its existence, the club was elected to the bottom tier of the Scottish Football League in 1902–03, a national sports league consisting of Scotland's top football clubs. At the time, the league consisted of two tiers, the First and Second Divisions. Falkirk was promoted to the top division with a second-place finish behind Clyde after two seasons. Despite the club's success, several months beforehand a proposal to merge with local rivals East Stirlingshire was raised, which was narrowly rejected in a vote. In 1907–08, Falkirk's third season in the top flight, the club finished the season in second place, its highest league position to date, and repeated this in the 1909–10 season. On both occasions it finished behind champions Celtic despite being the top goal scorers in the league, becoming the first Scottish club to break the 100 goals barrier in a single season. In 1913, the club won the Scottish Cup for the first time, defeating Raith Rovers in the final 2–0.

In 1922, the club broke the world record transfer fee, paying £5000 for the transfer of striker Syd Puddefoot from English club West Ham United. The following year, the club played against the Scottish Football League XI to raise funds for those affected by the Redding mine disaster.

Falkirk spent 30 consecutive seasons in their first spell in the top flight of Scottish football, before being relegated in 1934–35 after finishing 20th at the bottom of the league. Despite this, the club was promoted to the top flight after one season, as champions of the 1935–36 Second Division, amassing a club record of 132 league goals in the process. Falkirk remained in the top flight until the outbreak of World War II in 1939, when the league was suspended.

Post-war promotion and demotion 
After the war ended in 1945, the Scottish Football League resumed and Falkirk regained its place in the First Division for the 1946–47 season. In 1947, a new competition, the Scottish League Cup, was inaugurated. In the  1947–48 season, Falkirk reached the final, and lost 4–1 to East Fife in the replayed final after an initial 0–0 draw.

The club competed in the final of the Scottish Cup in 1957. They defeated Kilmarnock in a replay. This was their first success in the tournament since winning it 44 years earlier. In June 1958 Alex Parker and Eddie O'Hara from the cup winning side were bought by Everton for a combined fee or £18,000. John White was signed two months later from Alloa Athletic with £3,300 of that money.

In the years to follow, relegation and promotion between the first and second tiers occurred seven times until the 1995–96 season. The club spent eight consecutive seasons at a time in either division. As a result, Falkirk has won or finished runners-up in the second tier of Scottish football a record 14 times, the majority occurring in this period. The club also spent three seasons in the late 1970s in the newly created third tier, the lowest tier it has competed in. In 1977–78 the club finished in its lowest ranking to date, ending the season in the equivalent of 29th in Scotland following a 5th-place finish in the new Second Division. In the 1996–97 season, the club reached the final of the Scottish Cup for the third time, and Falkirk became the seventh club in 106 years to reach the final whilst competing outside the top league of Scottish football. Falkirk's opponents were Kilmarnock, a repeat of the 1957 final, but the club could not match its 1957 success and lost 1–0.

Scottish Premier League 
The Scottish Premier League (SPL) was founded in 1998 as the new top flight of Scottish football. The new league and its rules denied Falkirk the chance to be promoted into it on three occasions as a consequence of its formation. When the SPL was created from the old Premier Division, a play-off match that was held between the team ranked ninth in the Premier Division and the team ranked second in the First Division was abolished during the 1997–98 season. Falkirk, ranked second in the First Division, was thus denied a play-off with Motherwell. The SPL's criterion that clubs required a 10,000 capacity all-seater stadium in order to compete in the new league, which Falkirk's Brockville Park did not comply with, was introduced. When the SPL was due to expand to 12 teams at the end of the 1999–2000 season, Aberdeen, which finished bottom of the SPL, would have competed in a three-way play-off against the teams that finished second and third in the First Division, and two of these three clubs would gain SPL status for the next season. Brockville Park was still below the SPL criterion, and Falkirk applied to ground-share Murrayfield Stadium in Edinburgh, but the proposal was rejected. The play-off was abandoned, Dunfermline Athletic was automatically promoted and Aberdeen retained its status in the top flight.

Following four successive top three finishes in the First Division since 1997–98, the club's fortunes changed dramatically and it finished the season in ninth position, which would have qualified the club to be relegated to the third tier. However, it was spared relegation by the liquidation of fellow First Division club Airdrieonians on the last day of the season. The following season, Falkirk was again denied promotion to the SPL despite finishing top of the First Division. The club submitted another application to ground-share, this time at New Broomfield – an SPL compliant stadium and the home of Airdrie United – but was rejected in a vote by SPL chairmen. Motherwell was thus spared relegation from the First Division. In order to meet the criterion, Falkirk started building a new stadium and left Brockville Park.

During the 2004–05 season, the SPL stadium criterion was reduced to 6,000, which the club's new Falkirk Stadium met. The club won the First Division that season, winning 1–0 to Ross County, and was promoted to the SPL. After three seasons in the SPL, including two seventh-place finishes, the club qualified for the inaugural season of the UEFA Europa League, the first time the club qualified for a European competition. The same year, Falkirk was beaten by Rangers in the final of the Scottish Cup. Despite its cup success, Falkirk finished in 10th place in the league and avoided relegation with a 1–0 win against Inverness Caledonian Thistle. The following season, the club competed in the Europa League but was relegated from the SPL to the First Division after being held to a 0–0 draw against Kilmarnock on the final day of the 2009–10 season.

Scottish First Division/Scottish Championship 
Following its return to the First Division, Falkirk finished the 2010–11 and 2011–12 seasons in third position. As members of the Scottish Football League, the club was eligible to compete in the Scottish Challenge Cup, which it won 1-0 against Hamilton Academical in 2012 to win the cup for a record fourth time. In the same year Falkirk reached the semi-finals of the League Cup, but lost to Celtic. The club had defeated the reigning SPL champions Rangers 3–2 in the third round, and also defeated another top flight club Dundee United on penalties in the quarter-finals.

In 2012-13 Falkirk finished a distant third in the league, 25 points behind champions Partick Thistle, but had a great run in the Scottish Cup, beating local rivals Stenhousemuir as well as Hamilton Academical en route to the semi-final against Hibernian at Hampden Park. Falkirk, under the management of Gary Holt for the first time, took a 3–0 half time lead, though Hibernian made a comeback to confirm their place in the final with a 4–3 win (AET). Gary Holt left the managers post in June 2014 to join Norwich on their coaching team. He was replaced by Peter Houston. In the 2013–14 season Falkirk finished third in the Scottish Championship, narrowly missing out on the title by 3 points having still been in with a chance on the final day of the season. They qualified for the Premiership play-off, where they defeated Queen of the South 4–3 on aggregate (AET) in the quarter-final, before losing to Hamilton Academical 2-1 on aggregate in the semis.

In 2014–15, Falkirk missed out on the play-off places, finishing in 5th place in the championship, Falkirk went one better in the Scottish Cup than two years previously, reaching the final, avenging their loss to Hibernian in the semi-finals before being defeated by Inverness 2–1 in the final. In 2015–16 Falkirk finished second in the Championship and qualified for the promotion play-offs. They defeated Hibernian 5–4 on aggregate in the semi-final before facing Kilmarnock. A 1–0 home win in the first leg put Falkirk on the verge of a return to top flight football. However, Kilmarnock won 4–0 in the second leg to retain their place in the Scottish Premiership 4–1 on aggregate.

The following season, Falkirk again finished second in the league and qualified for the play-offs. They went out to Dundee United 4–3 on aggregate in the semi-finals. Falkirk started the 2017–18 season very badly and the club found themselves in danger of relegation to League One. Manager Peter Houston was sacked in September 2017 following a 2–0 home loss to Livingston, which left the club second bottom of the league. Paul Hartley replaced him as manager. Hartley only won one of his first nine league games, and the club still sat in second bottom, 8 points from guaranteed safety at Christmas. A run of three wins in five games caused Falkirk to draw level on points with third bottom Dumbarton and eventually pull away to finish eighth.

Scottish League One 
Falkirk had a disastrous 2018–19 season which saw the club relegated on the final day, despite running out 3–2 winners against the Champions Ross County. This led to the club's second spell in the Scottish third tier. The 2019–20 season was declared early after 28 games played, leaving Falkirk in second place, 1 point behind Raith Rovers.

The 2020–21 season was another to forget for Falkirk fans. After starting the season on form and seeing themselves clear at the top of the table, a collapse in the second half of the season following a mid-season break due to the COVID-19 pandemic saw Falkirk fall to 5th in League One after a 2–0 defeat to Airdrieonians on the final day cost them a spot in the play-offs.

Colours and badge 

Falkirk's traditional colours are navy blue and white, which the team first wore during the 1882 season. However, the club's first strip, thin blue and white horizontal hoops on the jersey and socks, was worn between 1876 and 1880. This was replaced with a blue jersey and white shorts, which has featured predominantly since. Touches of red were introduced to the strip in the late 1930s – mostly on the socks – was worn until the early 1960s, re-introduced in the mid-1970s and has since been featured in the team's kit. For the 2017–18 season the kit consisted of a navy blue jersey, white shorts and navy socks.

Falkirk's current crest is a stylised version of the Falkirk Steeple, a dominant landmark of the town. During the 2007–08 season the club used a crest – known as "The Highlander" – that was worn during the club's 1957 Scottish Cup win as a 50th anniversary tribute to the players. Kit manufacturer Umbro supplied the club's kit for the 1977–78 season. Other kits have been supplied by Bukta, Patrick and Le Coq Sportif. The current supplier since 2008 is Puma and the club's shirt sponsor is Clarke ePOS (UK) Ltd. Recent sponsors include Central Demolition, Budweiser Budvar, John R Weir Mercedes Group and Beazer Homes.

Stadiums 

In the club's early years, Falkirk played its home games at three different sites: Hope Street, Randyford Park and Blinkbonny Park. The first pitch used by the club was on Hope Street, the location that would become Brockville Park in 1884. The first match at Hope Street was against Grasshoppers from Bonnybridge. After one season, Falkirk moved to Randyford Park, the home of East Stirlingshire Cricket Club during the summer months, in 1878 where the club played its first competitive match, which it won against Campsie Glen of Lennoxtown in the Scottish Cup. The ground was located near Forth Valley College, several hundred yards west of the present Falkirk Stadium. The club played at Blinkbonny Park between 1881 and 1883.

Between 1885 and 2003, Falkirk was based at Brockville Park, which was located a quarter of a mile (0.4 km) from the town centre of Falkirk. Brockville Park was largely terraced and had a capacity of between 7,500 and 8,000 spectators in its later years. On 21 February 1953, Falkirk's largest home attendance was recorded at the ground when 23,100 spectators watched the club play against Celtic in the third round of the Scottish Cup.

When the SPL was created in 1998, Brockville Park fell short of the SPL's stadium criteria, mainly because of the terraced stands. As a result, the club was denied entry to the league, despite winning the First Division or qualifying for a promotion play-off, on three occasions. Falkirk remained at the stadium until the last day of the 2002–03 football season, and in late 2003 Brockville was demolished and the site sold to supermarket chain Wm Morrison Supermarkets plc. To commemorate the club's time at the stadium, the supermarket displays Falkirk F.C. memorabilia, including a turnstile. For the 2003–04 season, Falkirk entered an agreement with Stenhousemuir to ground-share Ochilview Park stadium for one season while the club's new stadium was under construction.

Since the beginning of the 2004–05 season, the club has been based at Falkirk Stadium, an 7,937 capacity all-seater stadium built on the eastern outskirts of Falkirk. The stadium was opened in July 2004 with a friendly match against Dundee. When it opened, only the 4,200 capacity west stand was completed. The 2,000 capacity north stand was constructed during the opening season and was completed in May 2005, taking the stadium above the SPL's reduced 6,000 seating criterion. Falkirk became champions of the First Division that season and was promoted to the SPL. The stadium has since been further expanded; the south stand officially opened in a match against Royal Antwerp of Belgium in August 2009.

Supporters and rivalries 

Falkirk's strongest recent rivalry is the Kincardine derby which is contested with Dunfermline Athletic. The towns of Dunfermline and Falkirk are roughly 13 miles apart, separated  by the River Forth. Both clubs are a similar size and have regularly competed at the same level in the SPL and First Division but the origin of the rivalry is unclear, as former Falkirk manager John Hughes said in an interview in 2005. The two clubs have played important promotion and relegation encounters against each other over the past thirty years which has only increased the animosity between the two sets of fans.

In 2009 the Falkirk Herald recalled Super Tuesday: "More than 20 years ago a previously postponed league fixture took place at Brockville. The then mighty Dunfermline had come to town expecting victory as they looked to continue their push for promotion from the B&Q First Division. But, for over half of the 9200 supporters that packed the terraces on 7 March 1989, little did they know they would witness a match which would eventually become part of Falkirk folklore. Goals from Derek McWilliams, Paul Rutherford, Sammy McGivern and Stuart Burgess without reply brought the Pars back down to earth with an almighty bang."

A significant match between Falkirk and Dunfermline took place in April 2009, when they met at the semi-final stage of the 2008–09 Scottish Cup at Hampden Park; the Bairns won 2–0 in front of over 17,000 fans to progress to the final.

The club's traditional rival was East Stirlingshire, a club that was also based in Falkirk. The two teams regularly competed against each other in their early existences in the Stirlingshire Cup, as well as in league football following Falkirk's election to the Scottish Football League in 1902–03, two seasons after East Stirlingshire. As of May 2020, the last time the clubs played each other in a competitive league fixture was in April 1982, which East Stirlingshire won 3–0, when both clubs were in the First Division. Following East Stirlingshire's relegation that season, the two clubs have not competed in the same league; Falkirk predominantly in the First Division and East Stirlingshire in the Third Division. In 1999–00 the clubs were drawn against each other in the second round of the Scottish League Cup, which Falkirk won 2–0 after extra time was played, the last competitive fixture between the clubs excluding the Stirlingshire Cup.

Club staff

Current squad

On loan

Notable players

Managers 

The club's first manager was Willie Nicol, who was appointed in 1905, before which all manager appointments were assigned to the club secretary. Nicol was first appointed club secretary in 1900, then secretary/manager and finally manager. Nicol is the longest serving manager in Falkirk's history. Alex Totten, manager from 1996 to 2002 who led the side to the 1997 Scottish Cup Final, was named the clubs lifetime ambassador ahead of his retirement from football in 2021.

This list does not include caretaker managers or those who managed in a temporary capacity.

Only competitive matches are counted

Honours 
League
Scottish League Championships: (first tier)
 Runners-up (2): 1907–08, 1909–10
Scottish First Division: (second tier)
 Winners (7): 1935–36, 1969–70, 1974–75, 1990–91, 1993–94, 2002–03, 2004–05
 Runners-up (8): 1904–05, 1951–52, 1960–61, 1985–86, 1988–89, 1997–98, 1998–99, 2015–16
 Scottish Second Division: (third tier)
 Winners (1): 1979–80
 Runners-up (1): 2019–20†

Cups
 Scottish Cup:
 Winners (2): 1913, 1957
 Runners-up (3):  1997, 2009, 2015
Scottish League Cup:
Runners-up (1): 1947–48
 Scottish Challenge Cup:
 Winners (4): 1993, 1997, 2004, 2012

†The 2019–20 Scottish League One season declared early after 28 games played after the Covid-19 outbreak.

Club records 
 League victory: 9–0 v Port Glasgow Athletic, Division One, 21 September 1907
 League defeat: 1–11 v Airdrieonians, Division One,  28 April 1951
 Cup victory: 11–1 v Tillicoultry, Scottish Cup, 7 September 1889; and 10–0 (twice) v Aberfeldy Breadalbane, Scottish Cup, 13 January 1923 and 23 January 1926

 Cup defeat: 1–9 v Motherwell, League Cup, 11 August 1962; 0–8 v Aberdeen, League Cup, 20 September 1972
 Record attendance: 23,100 v Celtic, Scottish Cup, Brockville Park, 21 February 1953
 Most international caps: 14, Alex Parker for Scotland (1955–58)
Most league goals in one season: 43, Evelyn Morrison, (1928–29)
Most goals in one season: 45, Evelyn Morrison, (1928–29)
Most league goals: 129, Kenneth Dawson, (1934–35 to 1950–51)
Most senior goals: 237, Kenneth Dawson, (1934–35 to 1950–51)
Most top division goals: 115, Jock Simpson, (1905–06 to 1921–22)
Most Scottish Cup goals: 12, Robert Keyes, (1934–35 to 1938–39)
Most League Cup goals: 25, Angus Plumb, (1949–50 to 1954–55)
 Most league appearances: 451, Tom Ferguson, (1919–20 to 1931–32)
 Most senior appearances: 498, Tom Ferguson, (1919–20 to 1931–32)
 Most Scottish Cup appearances: 47, Tom Ferguson, (1919–20 to 1931–32)
 Most League Cup appearances: 68, John Markie, (1964–65 to 1975–76)

European record 
Since the Union of European Football Associations (UEFA) was formed in 1960, Falkirk has qualified for a UEFA club competition on one occasion. In 2009, Falkirk reached the final of the Scottish Cup, which it lost to Rangers. The winner of the Scottish Cup would normally qualify for the UEFA Europa League, but because Rangers had already qualified for the UEFA Champions League through their league ranking in the SPL, the place was passed to Falkirk as runners-up. Falkirk was eliminated in the second qualifying round by FC Vaduz of Liechtenstein in a two-legged tie. The club's only European goal was scored by Ryan Flynn in the 1–0 first leg home victory against FC Vaduz.

See also 
McCrae's Battalion

References

External links 

 

 
Sport in Falkirk
Football clubs in Scotland
Association football clubs established in 1876
1876 establishments in Scotland
Scottish Premier League teams
Scottish Football League teams
Scottish Cup winners
Scottish Challenge Cup winners
Scottish Professional Football League teams